John Bolton (born 1948) is a former U.S. National Security Advisor and United States Ambassador to the United Nations.

John Bolton may also refer to:

Politicians
John Bolton (York MP), English Member of Parliament for the City of York in 1399 and 1407
John Bolton (Haverfordwest MP) (fl. 1524–1556), MP for Haverfordwest
John Bolton (Canadian politician) (1824–1872), member of the Canadian House of Commons
Sir John Bolton (Manx politician) (c. 1901–1980), Chairman of the Isle of Man Finance Board
John M. Bolton (1901–1936), Member of the Illinois House of Representatives and businessman

Others

John Bolton of Reading, imprisoned 1554 in Foxes Book of Martyrs
John Bolton (priest) (1665–1724), Dean of Derry
John Bolton, code name of Benjamin Tallmadge (1754–1835), George Washington's spymaster
John Bolton (merchant) (1756–1837), Liverpool merchant, slaver, landowner, and lieutenant-colonel
John Bolton, brother and co-worker of William Jay Bolton (1816–1884), American glassworker
John Bolton (cricketer) (1881–1935), Australian cricketer
John Gatenby Bolton (1922–1993), British-Australian astronomer
John Bolton (weightlifter) (born 1945), New Zealand weightlifter
John Bolton (illustrator) (born 1951), British comic and graphic artist
John Bolton (actor) (born 1965), American actor
John Bolton (Australian actor), winner of the Kenneth Myer Medallion for the Performing Arts in 2002

See also
John Bolton Rogerson (1809–1859), English poet
John Boulton, fictional character in British drama The Bill; played by Russell Boulter